This is a list of state leaders in the 11th century (1001–1100) AD, except for the many leaders within the Holy Roman Empire.

Africa

Africa: Central

Chad

Kanem Empire (Kanem–Bornu) (complete list) –
Hume, Mai (1068–1080)
Dunama I, Mai (1080–1133)

Africa: East

Ethiopia

Zagwe dynasty of Ethiopia (complete list) –
Jan Seyum, Negus (11th century)
Germa Seyum, Negus (11th century)
Yemrehana Krestos, Negus (11th century)
Kedus Harbe, Negus (c.1079–c.1119)

Africa: Northeast

Egypt

Fatimid Caliphate (complete list) –
al-Hakim bi-Amr Allah, Caliph (996–1021)
ali az-Zahir, Caliph (1021–1036)
al-Mustansir Billah, Caliph (1036–1094)
al-Musta'li, Caliph (1094–1101)

Sudan

Makuria (complete list) –
Georgios II, King (969–c.1002)
Raphael, King (1000–c.1006)
Stephanos, King (c.1027)
Solomon, King (1077–1079/80)
Georgios III, King (c.1079/80)
Basileios, King (c.1089)

Africa: Northcentral

Ifriqiya

Zirid dynasty (complete list) –
Badis ibn Mansur, ruler (995–1016)
al-Muizz ibn Badis, ruler (1016–1062)
Tamim ibn al-Mu'izz, ruler (1062–1108)

Africa: Northwest

Morocco

Almoravid dynasty (complete list) –
Abu Bakr ibn Umar, chieftain of the Lamtuna tribe (c.1060–1072)
Yusuf ibn Tashfin, Sultan of Morocco (1072–1106)

Africa: West

Nigeria

Kingdom of Kano (complete list) –
Bagauda, King (999–1063)
Warisi dan Bagauda, King (1063–1095)
Gijimasu dan Warisi, King (1095–1134)

Kingdom of Nri (complete list) –
Eri, King (948–1041)
Eze Nri Ìfikuánim, King (1043–1089)
Eze Nri Nàmóke, King (1090–1158)

Asia

Asia: Central

Afghanistan

Ghaznavid dynasty (complete list) –
Mahmud, Emir (998–1002), Sultan (1002–1030)
Muhammad, Sultan (1030–1030, 1040–1041)
Mas'ud I, Sultan (1030–1040)
Maw'dud, Sultan (1041–1048)
Mas'ud II, Sultan (1048)
Ali, Sultan (1048–1049)
Abd al-Rashid, Sultan (1049–1052)
Toghrul, Sultan (1052–1053)
Farrukh-Zad, Sultan (1053–1059)
Ibrahim, Sultan (1059–1099)
Mas'ud III, Sultan (1099–1115)

Mongolia

Khamag Mongol (complete list) –
Khaidu, ruler (?–c.1100)

Tibet

Guge
Lha lde, King (996–1024)
Nagaraja, ruler (?–1023)
Devaraja, ruler (?–1026)
'Od lde btsan, King (1024–1037)
Byang chub 'Od, King (1037–1057)
Che chen tsha rTse lde, King (1057–1088)
Bar lde (dBang lde), King (1088–c.1095)
bSod nams rtse, King (c.1095–early 12th century)

Uzbekistan

Samanid Empire (complete list) –
Isma'il Muntasir, Amir (1000–1004)

Asia: East

Khitan China: Liao dynasty

Liao dynasty (complete list) –
Shengzong, Emperor (982–1031) 
Xingzong, Emperor (1031–1055) 
Daozong, Emperor (1055–1101)

China: Northern Song

Song dynasty (complete list) –
Zhenzong, Emperor (997–1022) 
Renzong, Emperor (1022–1063) 
Yingzong, Emperor (1063–1067) 
Shenzong, Emperor (1067–1085) 
Zhezong, Emperor (1085–1100) 
Huizong, Emperor (1100–1125)

China: Other states and entities

Dingnan Jiedushi (complete list) –
Li Jiqian, Jiedushi (998–1004)
Li Deming, Jiedushi (1004–1031)

Dali Kingdom (complete list) –
Duan Suying, Emperor (985–1009)
Duan Sulian, Emperor (1009–1022)
Duan Sulong, Emperor (1022–1026)
Duan Suzhen, Emperor (1026–1041)
Duan Suxing, Emperor (1041–1044)
Duan Silian, Emperor (1044–1075)
Duan Lianyi, Emperor (1075–1080)
Duan Shouhui, Emperor (1080–1081)
Duan Zhengming, Emperor (1081–1094)
Gao Shengtai, Emperor (1094–1096)
Duan Zhengchun, Emperor (1096–1108)

Western Xia –
Jǐngzōng, Emperor (1038–1048)
Yìzōng, Emperor (1048–1067)
Huìzōng, Emperor (1067–1086)
Chóngzōng, Emperor (1086–1139)

Japan

Heian period Japan (complete list) –
Ichijō, Emperor (986–1011)
Sanjō, Emperor (1011–1016)
Go-Ichijō, Emperor (1016–1036)
Go-Suzaku, Emperor (1036–1045)
Go-Reizei, Emperor (1045–1068)
Go-Sanjō, Emperor (1068–1073)
Shirakawa, Emperor (1073–1087)
Horikawa, Emperor (1087–1107)

Korea

Goryeo (complete list) –
Mokjong, King (997–1009)
Hyeonjong, King (1009–1031)
Deokjong, King (1031–1034)
Heonjong, King (1094–1095)
Sukjong, King (1095–1105)

Asia: Southeast

Cambodia
Khmer Empire (complete list) –
Jayavarman V, King (968–1001)
Udayadityavarman I, King (1002)
Jayavirahvarman, King (1002–1006)
Suryavarman I, King (1006–1050)
Udayadityavarman II, King (1050–1066)
Harshavarman III, King (1066–1080)
Jayavarman VI, King (1080–1107)
Nripatindravarman, King (1080–1113)

Indonesia

Indonesia: Java

Mataram Kingdom: Isyana dynasty (complete list) –
Dharmawangsa, King (991–1016)

Sunda Kingdom (complete list) –
Prabu Brajawisesa, Maharaja (989–1012)
Prabu Dewa Sanghyang, Maharaja (1012–1019)
Prabu Sanghyang Ageng, Maharaja (1019–1030)
Prabu Detya Maharaja Sri Jayabupati, Maharaja (1030–1042)
Dharmaraja, Maharaja (1042–1064)
Prabu Langlangbhumi, Maharaja (1064–1154)

Kahuripan –
Airlangga, Raja (1019–1045)

Indonesia: Sumatra
Srivijaya –
Shailendra dynasty
Sri Maravijayottungga, King (c.1008)
Sumatrabhumi, King (c.1017)
Sangrama Vijayatunggavarman, King (c.1025)
Palembang
Sri Deva, King (c.1028)
Kulothunga Chola I, King (c.1078)

Indonesia: Lesser Sunda Islands

Bali Kingdom: Warmadewa dynasty (complete list) –
Udayana Warmadewa, King (fl.989–1011)
Śri Ajñadewi, Queen (fl.1016)
Dharmawangsa Wardhana Marakatapangkaja, King (fl.1022–1025)
Airlangga, King (c.1025–1042)
Anak Wungsu, King (fl.1049–1077)
Śri Maharaja Walaprabhu, King (between 1079–1088)
Śri Maharaja Sakalendukirana Laksmidhara Wijayottunggadewi, Queen (fl.1088–1101)

Malaysia: Peninsular
Kedah Sultanate (complete list) –
Durbar II, Raja (c.956–1136)

Myanmar / Burma

Early Pagan Kingdom/ Pagan Kingdom (complete list) –
Kunhsaw Kyaunghpyu, King (early 11th century)
Kyiso, King (early 11th century)
Sokkate, King (early 11th century)
Anawrahta, King (1044–1077)
Saw Lu, King (1077–1084)
Kyansittha, King (1084–1112/13)

Thaton Kingdom (complete list) –
Udinna Yaza, King (?–1030s)
Manuha, King (1030s–1057)

Philippines
Rajahnate of Butuan (complete list) –
Kiling, Rajah (989–1009)
Sri Bata Shaja, Rajah (1011–?)

Thailand
Ngoenyang (complete list) –
Lao Som, King (early 11th century)
Lao Kuak, King (mid 11th century)
Lao Kiu, King (late 11th century)
Lao Chong, King (11th–12th century)

Vietnam

Champa (complete list) –
Yang Pu Ku Vijaya, King (c.998–1007)
Harivarman III, King (fl. 1010)
Paramesvaravarman II, King (fl.1018)
Vikrantavarman IV, King (?–1030)
Jaya Sinhavarman II, King (1030–1044)
Jaya Paramesvaravarman I, King (1044–?)
Bhadravarman III, King (?–1061)
Rudravarman III, King (1061–1074)
Harivarman IV, King (1074–1080)
Jaya Indravarman II, King (1080–1081, 1086–1114)
Paramabhodhisatva, King (1081–1086)

Đại Việt: Early Lê dynasty (complete list) –
Lê Hoàn, Emperor (980–1005)
Lê Trung Tông, Emperor (1005)
Lê Long Đĩnh, Emperor (1005–1009)

Đại Việt: Later Lý dynasty (complete list) –
Lý Thái Tổ, Emperor (1009–1028)
Lý Thái Tông, Emperor (1028–1054)
Lý Thánh Tông, Emperor (1054–1072)
Lý Nhân Tông, Emperor (1072–1127)

Asia: South

Afghanistan

Ghaznavids (complete list) –
Mahmud, Sultan (998–1030)
Muhammad, Sultan (1030–1031, 1040–1041)
Masʽud I, Sultan (1030–1040)
Mawdud, Sultan (1041–1050)
Masʽud II, Sultan (c.1050)
Ali, Sultan (c.1050)
Abd al-Rashid, Sultan (c.1050–1052)
Toghrul, Sultan (1052–1053)
Farrukh-Zad, Sultan (1053–1059)
Ibrahim, Sultan (1059–1099)
Masʽud III, Sultan (1099–1115)

Ghurid dynasty (complete list) –
Muhammad ibn Suri, Malik (10th century–1011)
Abu Ali ibn Muhammad, Malik (1011–1035)
Abbas ibn Shith, Malik (1035–1060)
Muhammad ibn Abbas, Malik (1060–1080)
Qutb al-din Hasan, Malik (1080–1100)
Izz al-Din Husayn, Malik (1100–1146)

Bengal and Northeast India

Kamarupa: Pala dynasty –
Go Pala, King (990–1015)
Harsha Pala, King (1015–1035)
Dharma Pala, King (1035–1060)
Jaya Pala, King (1075–1100)

Mallabhum (complete list) –
Jagat Malla, King (994–1007)
Prakash Malla, King (1097–1102)

Kingdom of Manipur (complete list) –
Loiyumba, King (1074–1112)

Pala Empire (complete list) –
Mahipala I, King (977–1027)
Nayapala, King (1027–1043)
Vigrahapala III, King (1043–1070)
Mahipala II, King (1070–1071)
Shurapala, King (1071–1072)
Ramapala, King (1072–1126)

Pala dynasty of Kamarupa (complete list) –
Go Pala, King (990–1015)
Harsha Pala, King (1015–1035)
Dharma Pala, King (1035–1060)
Jaya Pala, King (1075–1100)

Sena dynasty (complete list) –
Hemanta Sena, King (1070–1096)
Vijaya Sena, King (1096–1159)

India

Amber Kingdom (complete list) –
Sorha Deva, King (966–1006)
Dullah Rai, King (1006–1036)
Kakil, King (1036–1039)
Hanu, King (1039–1053)
Janddeo, King (1053–1070)
Pajjun Rai, King (1070–1094)
Malayasi, King (1094–1146)

Chahamanas of Naddula (complete list) –
Mahindra, King (c.994–1015)
Ashvapala, King (c.1015–1019)
Ahila, King (c.1019–1024)
Anahilla, King (c.1024–1055)
Balaprasada, King (c.1055–1070)
Jendraraja, King (c.1070–1080)
Prithvipala, King (c.1080–1090)
Jojalladeva, King (c.1090–1110)

Chahamanas of Shakambhari (complete list) –
Govindaraja III, King (c.1012–1026)
Vakpatiraja II, King (c.1026–1040)
Viryarama, King (c.1040)
Chamundaraja, King (c.1040–1065)
Durlabharaja III, King (c.1065–1070)
Vigraharaja III, King (c.1070–1090)
Prithviraja I, King (c.1090–1110)

Chandelas of Jejakabhukti (complete list) –
Ganda-Deva, King (c.999–1002)
Vidyadhara, King (c.1003–1035)
Vijaya-Pala, King (c.1035–1050)
Deva-Varman, King (c.1050–1060)
Kirtti-Varman, King (c.1060–1100)
Sallakshana-Varman, King (c.1100–1110)

Chaulukya dynasty of Gujarat (complete list) –
Chamundaraja, King (996–1008)
Vallabharaja, King (1008)
Durlabharaja, King (1008–1022)
Bhima I, King (1022–1064)
Karna, King (1064–1092)
Jayasimha Siddharaja, King (1094–1143)

Eastern Chalukyas (complete list) –
Shaktivarman I, King (1000–1011)
Vimaladitya, King (1011–1018)
Rajaraja Narendra, King (1019–1061)
Vijayaditya VII, King (?)

Western Chalukya Empire (complete list) –
Satyashraya, King (997–1008)
Vikramaditya V, King (1008–1015)
Jayasimha II, King (1015–1042)
Someshvara I, King (1042–1068)
Someshvara II, King (1068–1076)
Vikramaditya VI, King (1076–1126)

Chera/Perumals of Makotai (complete list) –
Bhaskara Ravi Manukuladithya, King (962–1021)
Ravi Kotha Rajasimha, King (c.1021–c.1036)
Raja Raja, King (c.1036–1089)
Ravi Rama Rajadithya, King (c.1036–1089)
Adithyan Kotha Ranadithya, King (c.1036–1089)
Rama Varma Kulashekhara, King (1089–1102/22)

Chola dynasty (complete list) –
Rajaraja I, King (c.985–1014)
Rajendra Chola I, King (1012–1044)
Rajadhiraja Chola, King (1018–1054)
Rajendra Chola II, King (1051–1063)
Virarajendra Chola, King (1063–1070)
Athirajendra Chola, King (1067–1070)
Kulothunga Chola I, King (1070–1120)

Gahadavala dynasty (complete list) –
Chandradeva, King (c.1089–1103)

Eastern Ganga dynasty (complete list) –
Vajrahasta Aniyakabhima, King (980–1015)
Vajrahasta Anantavarman or Vajrahasta V, King (1038–?)
Rajaraja Devendravarman or Rajaraja Deva I, King (?–1078)
Anantavarman Chodaganga, King (1078–1150)

Garhwal Kingdom (complete list) –
Agasti Pal, King (995–1014)
Surati Pal, King (1015–1036)
Jay Pal, King (1037–1055)
Anant Pal I, King (1056–1072)
Anand Pal I, King (1072–1083)
Vibhog Pal, King (1084–1101)

Gurjara-Pratihara dynasty (complete list) –
Rajapala, King (960–1018)
Trilochanapala, King (1018–1027)
Yasahpala, King (1024–1036)

Hoysala Empire (complete list) –
Nripa Kama II, King (1026–1047)
Vinayaditya, King (1047–1098)
Ereyanga, King (1098–1102)

Kalachuris of Tripuri (complete list) –
Kokalla II, King (990–1015)
Gangeyadeva, King (1015–1041)
Lakshmikarna, King (1041–1073)
Yashahkarna, King (1073–1123)

Kalahandi (complete list) –
Raghunath Sai, Raja (1005–1040)

Kumaon Kingdom
Katyuri (complete list) –
Deshat Dev, King (1000–1015)
Padmata Dev, King (1015–1045)
Subhiksharaja Dev, King (1045–1060)
Dham Dev, King (?)
Bir Dev, King (?)
Chand (complete list) –
Vir Chand, King (1065–1080)
Rup Chand, King (1080–1093)
Laxmi Chand, King (1093–1113)

Lohara dynasty (complete list) –
Sangramaraja, King (1003–?)
Hariraja, King (1028)
Ananta-deva, King (1028–?)
Kalasha (Ranaditya II), King (1063–?)
Utkarsha, King (1089)
Harsha, King (1089–1101)

Pala dynasty of Kamarupa (complete list) –
Go Pala, King (990–1015)
Harsha Pala, King (1015–1035)
Dharma Pala, King (1035–1060)
Jaya Pala, King (1075–1100)

Paramaras of Chandravati (complete list) –
Dhurbhata, King (c.990–1000)
Mahi-pala, King (c.1000–1020)
Dhandhuka, King (c.1020–1040)
Punya-pala or Purna-pala, King (c.1040–1050)
Danti-varmman, King (c.1050–1060)
Krishna-deva, or Krishna-raja II, King (c.1060–1090)
Kakkala-deva, or Kakala-deva, King (c.1090–1115)

Paramara dynasty of Malwa (complete list) –
Sindhuraja, King (990s–1010)
Bhoja, King (1010–1055)
Jayasimha I, King (1055–1070)
Udayaditya, King (1070–1086)
Lakshmadeva, King (1086–1094)
Naravarman, King (1094–1130)

Pakistan

Hindu Shahi (complete list) –
Jayapala, King (964–1001)
Anandapala, King (1001–1010)
Trilochanapala, King (1010–1021)

Soomra dynasty –
Khafif, King (1011–1026)
Asimuddin Bhoongar, King (?–1064/65)
Zainab Tari, Queen (1092–1102)

Sri Lanka

Anuradhapura Kingdom (complete list) –
Sena V, King (991–1001)
Mahinda V, King (1001–1017)

Kingdom of Polonnaruwa (complete list) –
Vijayabahu I, King (1056–1111)

Asia: West

Mesopotamia

Abbasid Caliphate, Baghdad (complete list) –
al-Qadir, Caliph (991–1031)
al-Qa'im, Caliph (1031–1075)
al-Muqtadi, Caliph (1075–1094)
al-Mustazhir, Caliph (1094–1118)

Hamdanid dynasty (complete list) –
Emirate of Aleppo
Sa'id al-Dawla, Emir (991–1002)

Persia

Buyid Empire (complete list) –
Buyids in Fars
Baha' al-Dawla, Emir (998–1012)
Sultan al-Dawla, Emir (1012–1024)
Abu Kalijar, Emir (1024–1048)
Abu Mansur Fulad Sutun, Emir (1048–1051)
Abu Sa'd Khusrau Shah, Emir (1051–1054)
Abu Mansur Fulad Sutun, Emir (1051–1062)

Buyids in Ray
Majd al-Dawla, Emir (997–1029)

Buyids in Iraq
Baha' al-Dawla, Emir (989–1012)
Sultan al-Dawla, Emir (1012–1021)
Musharrif al-Dawla, Emir (1021–1025)
Jalal al-Dawla, Emir (1025–1044)
Abu Kalijar, Emir (1044–1048)
Al-Malik al-Rahim, Emir (1048–1055)

Saffarid dynasty (complete list) –
Khalaf ibn Ahmad, Amir (963–1002)

Samanid Empire (complete list) –
Isma'il Muntasir, Amir (1000–1004)

Ziyarid dynasty (complete list) –
Qabus, Emir (997–1012)
Manuchihr, Emir (1012–1031)
Anushirvan Sharaf al-Ma'ali, Emir (1030–1050)
Keikavus, Emir (1050–1087)
Gilanshah, Emir (1087–1090)

Yemen

Yemeni Zaidi State (complete list) –
al-Mansur al-Qasim al-Iyyani, Imam (999–1002)
ad-Da'i Yusuf, Imam (1002–1012)
al-Mahdi al-Husayn, Imam (1003–1013)
al-Mu'ayyad Ahmad, Imam (1013–1020)
Abu Talib Yahya, Imam (1020–1033)
al-Mu’id li-Din Illah, Imam (1027–1030)
Abu Hashim al-Hasan, Imam (1031–1040)
Abu'l-Fath an-Nasir ad-Dailami, Imam (1038–1053)
al-Muhtasib al-Mujahid Hamzah, Imam (1060–1067)

Europe

Europe: Balkans

First Bulgarian Empire (complete list) –
Samuil, Emperor (997–1014)
Gavril Radomir, Emperor (1014–1015)
Ivan Vladislav, Tsar (1015–1018)

Byzantine Empire (complete list) –
Basil II, Emperor (976–1025)
Constantine VIII, Emperor (1025–1028)
Zoe, Emperor (1028–1034) (first reign) and Romanos III Argyros, Emperor (1028–1034)
Zoe, Emperor (1034–1041) (first reign) and Michael IV the Paphlagonian, Emperor (1034–1041)
Michael V Kalaphates, Emperor (1041–1042)
Zoe, Emperor (1042) (second reign) with Theodora, Emperor (1042)
Zoe, Emperor (1042–1050) (second reign) and Constantine IX Monomachos, Emperor (1042–1050)
Constantine IX Monomachos, Emperor (1050–1055) (sole emperor)
Theodora, Emperor (1055–1056)
Michael VI Bringas, Emperor (1056–1057)
Isaac I Komnenos, Emperor (1057–1059)
Constantine X Doukas, Emperor (1059–1067)
Romanos IV Diogenes, Emperor (1068–1071)
Michael VII Doukas, Emperor (1068–1078) with brothers Andronikos, Emperor (1068–1078) and Konstantios, Emperor (1068–1078) and son Constantine, Emperor (1068–1078)
Nikephoros III Botaneiates, Emperor (1078–1081)
Alexios I Komnenos, Emperor (1081–1118)

Kingdom of Croatia (complete list) –
Svetoslav Suronja, King (997–1000)
Gojslav, co-King (1000–c.1020)
Krešimir III, co-King (1000–c.1030) 
Stephen I, King (c.1030–1058)
Peter Krešimir IV, King (1058–1074)
Demetrius Zvonimir, King (1075–1089)
Stephen II, King (1089–1091)
Ladislaus I of Hungary, King (1091–1095)
Petar Snačić, claimant King (1093–1097)
thereafter ruled by kings of Hungary

Duklja (complete list) –
Petar, Archon (c.1000)
Jovan Vladimir, Prince (c.1000–1016)
Stefan Vojislav, Archon, King (1018–c.1043)
Mihailo I, King (c.1077–1081)
Constantine Bodin, King (1081–1101)

Europe: British Isles

Great Britain: Scotland

Kingdom of Scotland/ Kingdom of Alba (complete list) –
Kenneth III, King (997–1005)
Malcolm II, King (1005–1034)
Duncan I, King (1034–1040)
Macbeth, King (1040–1057)
Lulach, King (1057–1058)
Malcolm III Canmore, King (1058–1093)
Donald III, King (1093–1094)
Duncan II, King (1094)
Donald III, King (1094–1097)
Edgar, King (1097–1107)

Kingdom of Strathclyde (complete list) –
Owain Foel, King (c.997–c.1018)
Máel Coluim II, King (c.1054)

Kingdom of the Isles (complete list) –
Ragnall mac Gofraid, King (?–1004/05)
Lagmann mac Gofraid, possible ruler (c.1005)
Echmarcach mac Ragnaill, possible ruler (1052–1061)
Murchad mac Diarmata, King (1061–1070)
Fingal mac Gofraid, King (?–1074)
Godred Crovan, King (1079–1094)
Magnus Barefoot, King (1098–1102)

Great Britain: England

Kingdom of England (complete list) –
Æthelred the Unready, King (978–1013, 1014–1016)
Sweyn, King (1013–1014)
Edmund Ironside, King (1016)
Cnut the Great, King (1016–1035)
Harold Harefoot, King (1035–1040)
Harthacnut, King (1040–1042)
Edward the Confessor, King (1042–1066)
Harold Godwinson, King (1066)
Edgar Ætheling, King (1066)
William the Conqueror, King (1066–1087)
William II, King (1087–1100)
Henry I, King (1100–1135)

Great Britain: Wales

Glywysing (complete list) –
Rhys ab Owain, King (c.990–c.1000)
Iestyn ab Owain, King (c.990–c.1015)
Hywel ab Owain, King (c.990–c.1043)
Rhydderch ap Iestyn, King (c.1015–1033) 
Gruffydd ap Rhydderch, King (1033–1055)
Gwrgant ab Ithel the Black, King (1033–1070)
Gruffydd ap Llywelyn, King (1055–1063)
Caradog ap Gruffydd, King (1063–1081)
Iestyn ap Gwrgant, King (1081–1091)

Gwent (complete list) –
Rhodri ap Elisedd and Gruffydd ap Elisedd, co-Kings (983–c.1015)
Edwyn ap Gwriad, King (1015–1045)
Meurig ap Hywel and Cadwgan ap Meurig, co-Kings (1045–1055)

Morgannwg (complete list) –
Gruffydd ap Llywelyn, King (1055–1063)
Cadwgan ap Meurig, King (1063–1074)
Caradog ap Gruffydd, King (1075–1081)
Iestyn ap Gwrgant, King (1081–1091)

Kingdom of Gwynedd (complete list) –
Cynan ap Hywel, King (999–1005) 
Aeddan ap Blegywryd, King (1005–1018)
Llywelyn ap Seisyll, King (1018–1023)
Iago ab Idwal ap Meurig, King (1023–1039)
Gruffydd ap Llywelyn, King (1039–1063)
Bleddyn ap Cynfyn, King (1063–1075)
Trahaearn ap Caradog, King (1075–1081)
Gruffydd ap Cynan, King (1081–1137)

Kingdom of Powys (complete list) –
Llywelyn ap Seisyll, King (999–1023)
Rhydderch ap Iestyn, King (1023–1033)
Iago ap Idwal, King (1033–1039)
Gruffydd ap Llywelyn, King (1039–1063)
Bleddyn ap Cynfyn, King/Prince (1063–1075)
Iorwerth ap Bleddyn, Prince (1075–1103)
Cadwgan ap Bleddyn, Prince (1075–1111)

Deheubarth (complete list) –
Cynan ap Hywel, prince of Gwynedd (999–1005)
Edwin ab Einion, ruler (1005–1018)
Cadell ab Einion, ruler (1005–1018)
Llywelyn ap Seisyll, prince of Gwynedd (1018–1023)
Rhydderch ap Iestyn, prince of Glywysing (1023–1033)
Hywel ab Edwin, ruler (1033–1044)
Gruffydd ap Rhydderch, ruler (1047–1055)
Gruffydd ap Llywelyn, prince of Gwynedd (1055–1063)
Maredudd ab Owain ab Edwin, ruler (1063–1072)
Rhys ab Owain, ruler (1072–1078)
Rhys ap Tewdwr, ruler (1078–1093)
Gruffydd ap Rhys, ruler (1116–1137)

Ireland

Ireland (complete list) –
Máel Sechnaill mac Domnaill, High King (979–1002, 1014–1022)
Brian Bóruma, High King (1002–1014)
Donnchad mac Briain, High King (?–1064)
Diarmait mac Máel na mBó, High King (?–1072)
Toirdelbach Ua Briain, High King (?–1086)
Muirchertach Ua Briain, High King (?–1119)

Kingdom of Ailech (complete list) –
Áed mac Domnaill Ua Néill, King (989–1004)
Flaithbertach Ua Néill, King (1004–1031)
Áed mac Flaithbertaig Ua Néill, King (1031–1033)
Flaithbertach Ua Néill (again), King (1033–1036)
Niall mac Máel Sechnaill, King (1036–1061)
Ardgar mac Lochlainn, King (1061–1064)
Áed Ua hUalgairg, King (1064–1067)
Domnall mac Néill, King (1067–1068)
Áed mac Néill, King (1068–1083)
Donnchad mac Néill, King (1083–1083)
Domnall Ua Lochlainn, King (1083–1121)

Airgíalla (complete list) –
Mac Leiginn mac Cerbaill, King (?–1022)
Cathalan Ua Crichain, King (?–1027)
Gilla Coluim ua Eichnech, King (?–1048)
Leathlobair Ua Laidhgnen, King (?–1053)
Leathlobair Ua Laidhgnen, King (?–1078)
Aodh Ua Baoigheallain, King (?–1093)
Ua Ainbhigh, King (?–1094)
Cu Caishil Ua Cerbaill, King (?–1101)

Kingdom of Breifne (complete list) –
Niall Ó Ruairc, heir (1000–1001)
Aedh Ó Ruairc, King (?–1014/15)
Art an caileach Ó Ruairc, King (c.1020–c.1030)
Aedh Ó Ruairc, Lord (1029)
Art uallach (oirdnidhe) Ó Ruairc, King (c.1030–1046)
Niall Ó Ruairc, King (1047)
Domnall Ó Ruairc, Lord (c.1057)
Cathal Ó Ruairc, Lord (c.1051–1059)
Aedh in Gilla Braite Ó Ruairc, King (1066)
Aed Ó Ruairc, King (c.1067–1087)
Donnchadh cael Ó Ruairc, King (c.1084)
Ualgharg Ó Ruairc, heir (1085)

Connachta (complete list) –
Cathal mac Conchobar mac Taidg, King (973–1010)
Tadg in Eich Gil, King (?)
Áed in Gai Bernaig, King (?)
Ruaidrí na Saide Buide, King (?)
Dubhchobhlaigh Bean Ua hEaghra, King (?)
Tadg mac Ruaidrí Ua Conchobair, King (?)
Domnall Ua Ruairc, King (1097–1102)

Kingdom of Dublin (complete list) –
Sigtrygg Silkbeard, King (989/995–1036)
Echmarcach mac Ragnaill, King (1036–1038, 1046–1052)
Ímar mac Arailt, King (1038–1046)
Murchad mac Diarmata, King (1052–1070)
Diarmait mac Máel na mBó, King (?–1072)
Gofraid mac Amlaíb meic Ragnaill, King (1072–1075)
Domnall mac Murchada, King (1075)
Muirchertach Ua Briain, Governor (1075–1086)
Donnchad mac Domnaill Remair, King (1086–1089)
Godred Crovan, King (c.1091–1094)

Leinster (complete list) –
Donnchad mac Domnall Claen, King (984–1003)
Máelmórda mac Murchada, King (1003–1014)
Dúnlaing mac Tuathal, King (1014)
Donncuan mac Dúnlainge, King (1014–1016)
Bran mac Máelmórda, King (1016–1018)
Augaire mac Dúnlainge, King (1018–1024)
Donnchad mac Dúnlainge, King (1024–1033)
Donnchad mac Gilla Pátraic, King (1033–1039)
Murchad mac Dúnlainge, King (1039–1042)
Diarmait mac Maíl na mBó, King (1042–1072)
Murchad mac Diarmata, King (1052–1070)
Domnall mac Murchada, King (1072–1075)
Donnchad mac Domnaill Remair, King (1075–1089)
Énna mac Diarmata, King (1089–1092)
Diarmait mac Énna, King (1092–1098)
Donnchadh mac Murchada, King (1098–1115)

Magh Luirg (complete list) –
Tadhg mac Muirchertach, King (?)
Maelruanaidh mac Tadhg, King (fl.1080)

Kingdom of Meath (complete list) –
Máel Sechnaill mac Domnaill, King (975/976–1022)
Mael Sechnaill Got mac Mael Sechnaill, King (1022–1025)
Roen mac Muirchertaig, King (1025–1027)
Domnall Got, King (1027–1030)
Conchobar ua Mael Sechlainn, King (1030–1073)
Murchad mac Flainn Ua Mael Sechlainn, King (1073)
Mael Sechlainn Ban mac Conchobair Ua Mael Sechlainn, King (1073–1087)
Domnall mac Flainn Ua Mael Sechlainn, King (1087–1094)
Donnchad mac Murchada Ua Mael Sechlainn, King (1094–1105)
Conchobar mac Mael Sechlainn Ua Mael Sechlainn, King (1094–1105)

Kingdom of Munster (complete list) –
Brian Boru, King (978–1014)
Dúngal Hua Donnchada, King (1014–1025)
Donnchad mac Briain, King (1025–1064)
Murchad mac Donnchada, King (1064–1068)
Toirdelbach Ua Briain, King (1068)
Muirchertach Ua Briain, King (1086–1114, 1118–1119)

Síol Anmchadha (complete list) –
Cú Connacht mac Dundach, King (1006)
Madudan mac Gadhra Mór, King (1008)
Gadhra Mór mac Dundach, King (1008–1027)
Dogra mac Dúnadach, King (1027)
Dunadach mac Cú Connacht, King (1027–1032)
Diarmaid mac Madudan, King (1032–1069)
Madudan Reamhar Ua Madadhan, King (1069–1096)
Gillafin Mac Coulahan, King (1096–1101)

Uí Maine (complete list) –
Tadhg Mór Ua Cellaigh, King (?–1014)
Concobar mac Tadg Ua Cellaigh, King (?–1030)
Mac Tadhg Ua Cellaigh, King (?–1065)
Dunchadh Ua Cellaigh, King (?–1074)
Aed Ua Cellaigh, King (?–1134)

Ulaid / Ulster (complete list) –
Eochaid mac Ardgail, King (972–1004)

Europe: Central

Holy Roman Empire in Germany

See also List of state leaders in the 11th-century Holy Roman Empire

Holy Roman Empire, Kingdom of Germany (complete list, complete list) –
Otto III, Holy Roman Emperor (996–1002), King (983–1002)
Henry II, Holy Roman Emperor (1014–1024), King (1002–1024)
Conrad II, Holy Roman Emperor (1027–1039), King (1024–1039)
Henry III, Holy Roman Emperor (1046–1056), King (1028–1056)
Henry IV, Holy Roman Emperor (1084–1105), King (1053–1087)
Conrad II of Italy, King (1087–1098)
Henry V, Holy Roman Emperor (1111–1125), King (1099–1125)

Hungary

Kingdom of Hungary (1000–1301) (complete list) –
Stephen I, Grand Prince (997–1000), King (1000–1038)
Peter, King (1038–1041, 1044–1046)
Samuel, King (1041–1044)
Andrew I, King (1046–1060)
Béla I, King (1060–1063)
Solomon, King (1063–1074)
Géza I, King (1074–1077)
Ladislaus I, King (1077–1095)
Coloman, King (1095–1116)

Poland

Civitas Schinesghe, Kingdom of Poland (complete list) –
Bolesław I, Duke (992–1025), King (1025)
Mieszko II Lambert, King (1025–1031), Duke (1032–1034)
Bezprym, Duke (1031–1032)
Bolesław the Forgotten, Duke (1034–1038/39)
Casimir I the Restorer, Duke (1040–1058)
Bolesław II the Generous, Duke (1058–1076), King (1076–1079)
Władysław I Herman, Duke (1079–1102)

Europe: East

Duchy of Belz (complete list) –
Wsewolod Mstislawitsch of Volhynien, Duke (1170-1195)

Volga Bulgaria (complete list) –
Abd ar-Rahman bine Mö'min, ruler (980–1006)

Khazar Khaganate (complete list) –
Georgius Tzul, ruler (?–1016)

Principality of Peremyshl (complete list) –
Ryurik Rostislavich, Prince (1085–1092)

Principality of Polotsk (complete list) –
Izyaslav, Prince (989–1001)

Kievan Rus' (complete list) –
Vladimir I the Great, Grand Prince (980–1015)
Sviatopolk I the Accursed, Grand Prince (1015–1019)
Yaroslav I the Wise, Grand Prince (1019–1054)
Iziaslav I of Kiev, Grand Prince (1054–1073)
Sviatoslav II of Kiev, Grand Prince (1073–1076)
Iziaslav I of Kiev, Grand Prince (1076–1078)
Vsevolod I of Kiev, Grand Prince (1078–1093)
Sviatopolk II of Kiev, Grand Prince (1093–1113)

Principality of Turov (complete list) –
Sviatopolk Vladimirovich, Prince (997–1019)

Europe: Nordic

Denmark

Denmark (complete list) – 
Sweyn Forkbeard, King (986–1014)
Harald II, King (1014–1018)
Cnut the Great, King (1018–1035)
Harthacnut, King (1035–1042)
Magnus the Good, King (1042–1047)
Sweyn II, King (1047–1076)
Harald III, King (1076–1080)
Canute, King (1080–1086)
Olaf I, King (1086–1095)
Eric, King (1095–1103)

North Sea Empire –
Cnut the Great, King (1013–1035)
Harthacnut, King (1035–1042)

Norway

Kingdom of Norway (872–1397) (complete list) –
Sweyn Forkbeard, King (c.985–995, 1000–1014)
Eric Haakonsson & Sweyn Haakonsson, Regents (1000–1015)
Olaf II of Norway, King (1015–1028)
Haakon Ericsson, Regent (1012–1015, 1028–1029)
Cnut the Great, King (1028–1035)
Svein Knutsson, co-King (1030–1035)
Magnus I the Good, King (1035–1047)
Harald Hardrada, King (1046–1066)
Magnus II, King (1066–1069)
Olaf III of Norway, King (1067–1093)
Haakon Magnusson, King (1093–1094)
Magnus III Barefoot, King (1093–1103)

Sweden

Sweden (800–1521) (complete list) –
Olof Skötkonung, King (c.995–1022)
Anund Jacob, King (1022–1050)
Emund the Old, King (1050–1060)
Stenkil, King (1060–1066)
Eric and Eric, King (c.1066–c.1067)
Halsten Stenkilsson, King (c.1067–c.1070, c.1079–post-1081)
Anund Gårdske, King (c.1070)
Håkan the Red, King (c.1075–c.1079)
Inge the Elder, King (c.1079–c.1084, c.1087–c.1105/10)
Blot-Sweyn, King (c.1084–c.1087)

Europe: Southcentral

See also List of state leaders in the 11th-century Holy Roman Empire#Italy

Kingdom of Italy (complete list) –
Otto III, King (996–1002)
Arduin of Ivrea, King (1002–1014)
Henry II, King (1004–1024)
Conrad II, King (1026–1039)
Henry III, King (1039–1056)
Henry IV, King (1056–1105)
Conrad II of Italy, King (1093–1098)
Henry V, King (1098–1125)

March of Montferrat (complete list) –
William III, ruler (991–pre-1042)
Otto II, ruler (pre-1042–c.1084)
Henry, ruler (?–1045)
William IV, Marquis (c.1084–c.1100)

Papal States (complete list) –
Sylvester II, Pope (999–1003)
John XVII, Pope (1003)
John XVIII, Pope (1003–1009)
Sergius IV, Pope (1009–1012)
Benedict VIII, Pope (1012–1024)
John XIX, Pope (1024–1032)
Benedict IX, Pope (1032–1044)
Sylvester III, Pope (1045)
Benedict IX, Pope (1045)
Gregory VI, Pope (1045–1046)
Clement II, Pope (1046–1047)
Benedict IX, Pope (1047–1048)
Damasus II, Pope (1048)
Leo IX, Pope (1049–1054)
Victor II, Pope (1055–1057)
Stephen IX, Pope (1057–1058)
Nicholas II, Pope (1058–1061)
Alexander II, Pope (1061–1073)
Gregory VII, Pope (1073–1085)
Victor III, Pope (1086–1087)
Urban II, Pope (1088–1099)
Paschal II, Pope (1099–1118)

Duchy of Spoleto (complete list) –
Romanus, Duke (1003–1010)
Rainier, Duke (1010–1020)
Hugh II, Duke (1020–1035)
Hugh III, Duke (1036–1043)
Boniface III, Duke (1043–1052)
Frederick, Duke (1052–1055)
Beatrice of Lorraine, Regent (1052–1055)
Godfrey the Bearded, Regent (1053–1055)
to the papacy (1056–1057)
Matilda, Duchess (1057–1082)
Godfrey the Bearded, Duke (1057–1069)
Godfrey the Hunchback, Duke (1069–1076)
Rainier II, Duke (1082–1086)
Matilda, Duke (1086–1093)
Werner II, Duke (1093–1119)

March of Tuscany (complete list) –
Hugh the Great, Margrave (961–1001)
Boniface, Margrave (1004–1011)
Rainier, Margrave (1014–1027)
Boniface III, Margrave (1027–1052)
Beatrice of Bar, Regent (1052–1054)
Frederick, Margrave (1052–1055)
Godfrey III the Bearded, Regent (1055–1069)
Godfrey IV the Hunchback, Regent (1069–1076)
Matilda, Margravine (1076–1115)

Republic of Venice (complete list) –
Pietro II Orseolo, Doge (991–1009)
Otto Orseolo, Doge (1009–1026)
Pietro Barbolano, Doge (1026–1032)
Domenico Flabanico, Doge (1032–1043)
Domenico Contarini, Doge (1043–1071)
Domenico Selvo, Doge (1071–1084)
Vitale Faliero, Doge (1084–1096)
Vitale I Michiel, Doge (1096–1102)

Southern Italy 
Southern Italy

Duchy of Amalfi (complete list) –
Manso I, Duke (966–1004)

County/ Duchy of Apulia and Calabria (complete list) –
William I Iron Arm, Count (1042–1046)
Drogo, Count (1046–1051)
Humphrey, Count (1051–1057)
Robert Guiscard, Count (1057–1059), Duke (1059–1085)
Roger I Borsa, Duke (1085–1111)

Principality of Benevento (complete list) –
Pandulf II, Prince (981–1014)
Landulf V, co-ruler (987–1014), Prince (1014–1033)
Pandulf III, co-ruler (1012–1033), Prince (1033–1053)
Landulf VI, co-ruler (1038–1053), Prince (1059–1077)

Principality of Capua (complete list) – 
Landulf VII, Prince (999–1007)
Pandulf II, Prince (1007–1022)
Pandulf III, Prince (1009–1014)
Pandulf IV, Prince (1016–1022, 1026–1038, 1047–1050)
Pandulf V, Prince (1022–1026)
John, Prince (1023–1026)
Guaimar, Prince (1038–1047)
Pandulf VI, Prince (1050–1057)
Landulf VIII, Prince (1057–1058)
Landulf VI, Prince (1038–1050)

Catepanate of Italy (complete list) –
Gregory Tarchaneiotes, Catepan (998–1006)

Duchy of Gaeta (complete list) – 
John III, co-Duke (979–984), Duke (984–1008)
John IV, co-Duke (991–1008), Duke (1008–1012)
Emilia, Regent (1012–1027)
Leo I, Regent (1017–1023)
John V, Duke (1012–1032)
Pandulf I, Duke (1032–1038)
Pandulf II, co–Duke (1032–1038)
Leo II, Duke (1042)
Guaimar, Duke (1042–1045)
Ranulf, Duke (1042–1045)
Asclettin, Duke (1045)
Atenulf I, Duke (1045–1062)
Atenulf II, Duke (1062–1064)
Maria, Regent (1062–1065)
William I, Duke (1064)
Lando, Duke (1064–1065)
Dannibaldo, Duke (1066–1067)
Geoffrey, Duke (1068–1086)
Reginald, Duke (1086–?)
Gualganus, Duke (?–1091)
Landulf, Duke (1091–1103)

March of Ivrea (complete list) – 
Arduin, Margrave (c.990–1015)

Duchy of Naples (complete list) – 
John IV, Duke (997/999–1005)
Sergius IV, Duke (1005–1038)
John V, Duke (1033–1050)
Sergius V, Duke (1038–1076)
Sergius VI, Duke (1077–1107)
John VI, Duke (1090–1122)

Principality of Salerno (complete list) – 
Guaimar III, Prince (994–1027)
Guaimar IV, Prince (1027–1052)
Gisulf II, Prince (1052–1077)

Emirate of Sicily (complete list) –
Ja'far al-Kalbi, Emir (998–1019)
al-Akhal, Emir (1019–1037)
Abdallah, usurper emir (1037–1040)
Hasan as-Samsam, Emir (1040–1053)
Ayyub ibn Tamim, Emir (1065–1068)

County of Sicily (complete list) –
Roger I, Count (1071–1101)

Principality of Taranto (complete list) –
Bohemond I, Count (1085–1088), Prince (1088–1111)

Europe: Southwest

Iberian Peninsula: Christian

Iberian Peninsula: Christian

Kingdom of Aragon (complete list) –
Ramiro I, King (1035–1063)
Sancho Ramírez, King (1063–1094)
Peter I, King (1094–1104)

Kingdom of Castile (complete list) –
Ferdinand I the Great, King (1037–1065)
Sancho II the Strong, King (1065–1072)
Alfonso VI the Brave, King (1072–1109)

County of Barcelona (complete list) –
Ramon Borrell, Count (988–1018)
Berenguer Ramon I, Count (1018/1023–1035)
Ramon Berenguer I, Count (1035/1039–1076)
Ramon Berenguer II, Count (1076–1082)
Berenguer Ramon II, Count (1076–1097)
Ramon Berenguer III, Count (1082–1131)

County of Castile (complete list) –
Sancho García, Count (995–1017)

Kingdom of León (complete list) –
Alfonso V, King (999–1028)

Kingdom of Navarre (complete list) –
Peter I, King (1094–1104)

County of Pallars (complete list) –
Ermengol I, Count (992–1010)
Suñer I, Count (995–1011)

Kingdom of Pamplona (complete list) –
García Sánchez II, King (994–1000/1004)

County of Portugal (complete list) –
Mendo II Gonçalves, Count (997–1008)

County of Ribagorza (complete list) –
Isarn, Count (990–1003)
Tota, Count (1003–1010)
William Isarn, Count (1010–1018)
Mayor García of Castile, Count (1010–1025)
Raymond III of Pallars (1010–1025)
Sancho III of Pamplona, Count (1018–1035)
Gonzalo, Count (1035–1045)
Peter I of Aragon and Navarre, Count (c.1085)
Sancho Ramírez, Count (1083–1093)

Kingdom of Viguera (complete list) –
Sancho Ramírez, King (c.991–c.1002)

Iberian Peninsula: Muslim

Iberian Peninsula: Muslim

Caliphate of Córdoba (complete list) –
Hisham II, Caliph (976–1008, 1010–1012)
Muhammad II, Caliph (1008–1009)
Sulayman ibn al-Hakam, Caliph (1009–1010, 1012–1017)
Abd ar-Rahman IV, Caliph (1021–1022)
Abd ar-Rahman V, Caliph (1022–1023)
Muhammad III, Caliph (1023–1024)
Hisham III, Caliph (1027–1031)

Taifa of Alpuente (complete list) –
'Abd Allah I, Emir (c.1009–1030)
Muhammad I Yumn ad-Dawla, Emir (1030–1042)
Ahmad b Muhammad 'Izz (o Adud) al-Dawla, Emir (1042–1043)
Muhammad II, Emir (1043)
'Abd Allah II, Emir (1043–c.1106)

Marca Hispanica

Marca Hispanica

County of Osona (complete list) –
Guisla de Lluça, Count (1035–1054)
William, Count (1035–1054)
Jimena, Count (1107–1149)

County of Cerdanya (complete list) –
Wilfred II, Count (988–1035)
Raymond, Count (1035–1068)
William I, Count (1068–1095)
William II, Count (1095–1109)

County of Urgell (complete list) –
Ermengol I of Córdoba, Count (992–1010)
Ermengol II the Pilgrim, Count (1010–1038)
Ermengol III of Barbastro, Count (1038–1065)
Ermengol IV of Gerp, Count (1065–1092)
Ermengol V of Mollerussa, Count (1092–1102)

Europe: West

Kingdom of France (complete list) –
Robert II, King (987–1031)
Henry I, King (1027–1060)
Philip I, King (1059–1108)

County of Angoulême (complete list) –
William IV (Taillefer II), Count (988–1028)
Alduin (II), Count (1028–1031)
Geoffrey, Count (1031–1047)
Fulk, Count (1047–1087)
William V (Taillefer III), Count (1087–1120)

Anjou (complete list) –
Fulk III, Count (987–1040)
Geoffrey II, Count (1040–1060)
Geoffrey III, Count (1060–1067)

Duchy of Aquitaine (complete list) –
William V, Duke (995–1030)
William VI, Duke (1030–1038)
Odo, Duke (1038–39)
William VII, Duke (1039–1058)
William VIII, Duke (1058–1086)
William IX, Duke (1086–1127)

Auvergne (complete list) –
William IV of Auvergne, Count (989–1016)
Robert I of Auvergne, Count (1016–1032)
William V of Auvergne, Count (1032–1064)
Robert II of Auvergne, Count (1064–1096)
William VI of Auvergne, Count (1096–1136)

County of Bar (complete list) –
Theodoric I, Count (978–1026/1027)

County of Blois (complete list) –
Theobald IV, Count (995–1004)

County of Boulogne (complete list) –
Baldwin II, Count (990–1025)
Eustace I, Count (1032–1049)
Eustace II, Count (1049–1087)
Eustace III, ruler (1087–1125)

Bourbonnais (complete list) –
, Lord (1034–c.1078)
, Lord (c.1078–1095)
, Lord (1095–1096)
, Lord (1096–1116)

Duchy of Brittany (complete list) –
Geoffrey I, Duke (992–1008)
Alan III, Duke (1008–1040)
Odo I, Duke (1008–1034)
Conan II, Duke (1040–1066)
Hawise, Duchess (1066–1072)
Hoël II, Duke (1066–1072)
Alan IV, Duke (1072–1112)

Kingdom of Burgundy-Arles (complete list) –
Rudolph III, King (993–1032)
For the succeeding rulers of Burgundy (later called Arles), see List of state leaders in the 11th-century Holy Roman Empire#Burgundian-Low Countries

Duchy of Burgundy (complete list) –
Eudes Henry, Duke (965–1002)
Otto-William, Count (982–1026), Duke (1002–1004)
Robert, Duke (1004–1016)
Henry, Duke (1016–1032)
Robert I, Duke (1032–1076)
Hugh I, Duke (1076–1079)
Odo I, Duke (1079–1103)

Provence/ Lower Burgundy (complete list) –
Rotbold I, Count (961–1008)
William II, Count (994–1018)
Rotbold II, Count (1008–1014)
Emma, Countess (1037–1062) and William III, Count (1014–1037)
William IV, Count (1018–1030)
Fulk Bertrand, Count (1018–1051)
Geoffrey I, Count (1032–1062)
William Bertrand, Count (1051–1094)
Geoffrey II, Count (1063–1067)
Bertrand II, Count (1063–1093)
Gerberga, Countess (1093–1112)

County of Flanders (complete list) –
Baldwin IV the Bearded, Count (988–1037)
Baldwin V of Lille, Count (1037–1067)
Baldwin VI, Count (1067–1070)
Arnulf III, Count (1070–1071)
Robert I the Frisian, Count (1071–1093)
Robert II, Count (1093–1111)

Duchy of Gascony (complete list) –
Bernat I, Duke (996–1009)
Sans VI, Duke (1009–1032)
Odo, Duke (1032–1039)
Bernat II, Duke (1039–1052)
William VIII, Duke (1052–1086)
William IX, Duke (1086–1126)

Lorraine (complete list) –
Theodoric I, Duke (978–1026/1027)

Lower Lorraine (complete list) –
Otto, Duke (977–1012)

County of Maine (complete list) –
Hugh III, Count (992–1015)
Herbert I Wakedog, Count (1015–1032)
Hugh IV, Count (1036–1051)
Herbert II, Count (1058–1062)
Walter of Mantes, Count (1062–1063)
Robert Curthose, Count (1063–1069)
Hugh V, Count (1069–1093)
Elias I, Count (1093–1110)

County of Nevers (complete list) –
Landri, Count (992–1028)
Renaud I, Count (1031–1040)
William I, Count (1040–1083)
Renaud II, Count (1083–1097)
William II, Count (1097–1148)

Duchy of Normandy (complete list) –
Richard II, Duke (996–1026)

County of Poitou (complete list) –
William III, Count (969–1030)
William IV, Count (1030–1038)
Odo, Count (1038–1039)
William V, Count (1039–1058)
William VI, Count (1058–1086)
William VII, Count (1071–1126)
William VIII, Count (1099–1137)

County of Toulouse (complete list) –
William III Taillefer, Count (978–1037)
Pons, Count (1037–1061)
William IV, Count (1061–1094)
Raymond IV (VI) of St Gilles, Count (1094–1105)
Philippa & William IX, Countess & Count (1098–1101, 1109–1117)

County of Vermandois (complete list) –
Albert II, Count (997–1035)
Otto, Count (1035–1045)
Herbert IV, Count (1045–1080)
Odo I, Count (1080–1085)
Adelaide, Countess (1085–1101)

Eurasia: Caucasus

Kingdom of Abkhazia (complete list) –
Bagrat III, King (978–1014)

Kingdom of Georgia (complete list) –
Bagrat III, King (1008–1014)
George I, King (1014–1027)
Bagrat IV, King (1027–1072)
George II, King (1072–1089)
David IV, King (1089–1125)

Bagratid Armenia (complete list) –
Gagik I, King (989–1020)
Hovhannes-Smbat of Ani, King (1020–1040)
Ashot IV the Valiant, King (1021–1039) 
Gagik II, King (1042–1045)

Kingdom of the Iberians (complete list) –
Sumbat III, King (992/993–1011)
Gurgen, King (c.1012)

Principality of Iberia (complete list) –
Gurgen of Georgia, King (994–1008)

First Kingdom of Kakheti (complete list) –
David, Prince (976–1010)
Kvirike III, Prince (1014–1029)

Klarjeti (complete list) –
Sumbat III, King (992/993–1011)
John Abuser, King (1011–1030)
Abuser I Abuserisdze, King (c.1046/47)
Grigol Abuserisdze, King (1047–1070)
Abuser II Abuserisdze, King (11th/12th century)

Oceania

Chile

Easter Island (complete list) –
Uru Kenu, King (c.1000)
Te Rurua Tiki Te Hatu, King (?)
Nau Ta Mahiki, King (?)
Te Rika Tea, King (?)
Te Teratera, King (?)
Te Ria Kautahito (Hirakau-Tehito?), King (?)

Tonga

Tuʻi Tonga Empire (complete list) –
Fangaʻoneʻone, King (?)
Līhau, King (?)
Kofutu, King (?)
Kaloa, King (?)
Maʻuhau, King (?)

See also
List of political entities in the 11th century
List of state leaders in the 11th-century Holy Roman Empire

References 

11th century
 
-